Alan Spencer Oakley (7 January 1907 – 21 July 1991) was an Australian rules footballer who played for the Richmond Football Club in the Victorian Football League (VFL).

Military service
Oakley later served in the Australian Army during World War II.

Notes

External links 
		

1907 births
1991 deaths
Australian rules footballers from Victoria (Australia)
Australian Rules footballers: place kick exponents
Richmond Football Club players